"The Radiation Therapy Oncology Group (RTOG) was initially organized in 1968 under the direction of Dr. Simon Kramer as a national cooperative group for the purpose of conducting radiation therapy research and clinical investigations. Funding from the National Cancer Institute (NCI) began in 1971. The group has grown considerably since the activation of its first study in 1968, an adjuvant methotrexate study for head and neck cancer. The methotrexate study employed combinations of radiation, methotrexate and surgery in the treatment of advanced head and neck cancer, and is considered a milestone in interdisciplinary clinical efforts. The over 700 patients accessed to this study formed the baseline for many of the clinical investigations in the area of head and neck cancer."

"Since its inception the Group has activated 300 protocols and accrued a total of about 60,000 patients to cooperative group studies."

"The Group Headquarters and Statistical Unit are located at the offices of the American College of Radiology in Philadelphia, Pennsylvania. The Headquarters Office has been in Philadelphia since the Group's inception, while the current Statistical Unit was formed in 1982."

References

External links
Radiation Therapy Oncology Group

Cancer organizations based in the United States
Medical research institutes in Pennsylvania
Radiology organizations
Clinical trial organizations